The 1917 New Hampshire football team was an American football team that represented New Hampshire College of Agriculture and the Mechanic Arts during the 1917 college football season—the school became the University of New Hampshire in 1923. In its third season under head coach William "Butch" Cowell, the team compiled a 3–2–2 record, while outscoring their opponents by a total of 129 to 53.

The team initially selected Joseph W. Morrill of Grafton, New Hampshire, as team captain. Due to his enlistment in the United States Navy before the start of the season, Charles B. Broderick, who had played high school football in nearby Exeter, New Hampshire, was selected as the new team captain.

Schedule

 The game against USS Des Moines is listed as a 13–13 tie by College Football Data Warehouse and the Wildcats' media guide. Two contemporary sources, The New Hampshire college newspaper and The Granite college yearbook, recorded it as a 13–6 win for New Hampshire.

Team captain Charlie Broderick became a high school football coach in Massachusetts, winning 252 games in a 42-year career.

Notes

References

New Hampshire
New Hampshire Wildcats football seasons
New Hampshire football